Mount Gexian is a  mountain in Yanshan County, Jiangxi, China. It has four best scenic spots: extraordinary pine trees, grotesque rocks, sea of clouds, and whistling of the wind in the pines. In January 2018, it has been designated as an AAAA level tourist site by the China National Tourism Administration.

Name
Legend has it that Han dynasty Taoist priest Ge Xuan became an immortal here.

Temples
Mount Gexian, one of the most ancient mount in China, has a long history and deep cultural roots. It is full of historical sites and cultural relics associated with numerous legends.

The Gexian Ancestral Temple, also known as Yuxu Temple, it the largest Taoist temple on the mountain. The original temple named "Zonghua Temple" dates back to the 9th century during the Tang dynasty (618–907). In 1065, Emperor Yingzong of Song inscribed and honored the name "Yuxu Temple". In 1092, it was renamed "Gexian Hall". It has been burned down and rebuilt a member of times, due to wars. The latest repair was in 1928. The grand temple complex is located in the northeast and faces the southwest with brief layout, it includes the Grand Hall of Gexian, Hall of Lord Lao Zi, Hall of Guanyin, Hall of Lingguan, Hall of the Earth Mother, and the Hall of Jade Emperor and east and west annex halls.

The Queen Mother Hall was built to commemorate Ge Xuan's mother.

The Ciji Temple is a Buddhist temple on the mountain. It was originally built in 1593 during the reign of Wanli Emperor in the Ming dynasty (1368–1644).

References

Geography of Shangrao
Tourist attractions in Shangrao
Gexian